George Edward Provens (June 1, 1918 – May 7, 1982) was an American Negro league third baseman in the 1940s.

A native of Lexington, Kentucky, Provens played for the Cleveland Buckeyes in 1945. He died in Canton, Ohio in 1982 at age 63.

References

External links
 and Seamheads

1918 births
1982 deaths
Cleveland Buckeyes players
Baseball third basemen
Baseball players from Lexington, Kentucky
20th-century African-American sportspeople